Kai Hundertmarck (born April 25, 1969 in Rüsselsheim) is a German former professional road racing cyclist and triathlete.

Career achievements

Major results

1989
 1st  Overall Bayern Rundfahrt
1st Stage 2
1990
 1st  Overall Grand Prix François Faber
1st Stages 1 & 3
 1st  Overall Rheinland-Pfalz Rundfahrt
1st Stage 3
1991
 2nd Road race, National Road Championships
 5th Road race, UCI World Road Championships
 7th GP du canton d'Argovie
1992
 3rd Road race, National Road Championships
1993
 8th Omloop Het Volk
 10th Rund um den Henninger Turm
1994
 5th Milan–San Remo
1996
 7th Overall Rheinland-Pfalz Rundfahrt
 7th Tour de Berne
1997
 1st Stage 5 Regio-Tour
 2nd Overall 3-Länder-Tour
1st Stages 2 & 5
 10th Giro di Romagna
1999
 2nd Road race, National Road Championships
 3rd Rund um Köln
 3rd Rund um den Flughafen Köln-Bonn
2000
 1st Eschborn–Frankfurt
2001
 2nd Overall Tour Down Under
1st Stage 5
2002
 2nd Rund um Köln
2003
 1st Rund um die Nürnberger Altstadt
 1st Stage 3 3-Länder-Tour

Grand Tour general classification results timeline

References

External links

1969 births
Living people
German male cyclists
People from Rüsselsheim
Sportspeople from Darmstadt (region)
Cyclists from Hesse